The Australian Department of Education, Employment and Workplace Relations (DEEWR) was a department of the Government of Australia.

It was formed in 2007 and absorbed the former departments of Education, Science and Training, and Employment and Workplace Relations. As a result of an Administrative Arrangements Order issued on 18 September 2013, the Department of Education and the Department of Employment were created out of the former Department of Education, Employment and Workplace Relations.

Scope 
In the Administrative Arrangements Order of 3 December 2007, the functions of the department were broadly classified into the following matters:
 Primary and secondary-level education policy and programs
 Science awareness programs in schools
 Income support policies and programs for students and apprentices
 Employment policy, including employment services
 Job Services Australia
 Labour market and income support policies and programs for people of working age
 Workplace relations policy development, advocacy and implementation
 Promotion of flexible workplace relations policies and practices
 Co-ordination of labour market research
 Australian government employment workplace relations policy, including administration of the framework for agreement making and remuneration and conditions
 Occupational health and safety, rehabilitation and compensation
 Equal employment opportunity
 Work and family programs
 Services to help people with disabilities obtain employment, other than supported employment
 Youth affairs and programs, excluding income support policies and programs
 Early childhood and childcare policy and programs

The department assisted in the commercialisation of Australian remote laboratories in higher education, injecting funds into the sector, supporting the foundation of the Labshare project.

References

Education, Employment and Workplace Relations
Education policy in Australia
Australia
Australia, Employment And Workplace Relations
Australia
Public policy in Australia
Labour in Australia
2013 disestablishments in Australia
2007 establishments in Australia
Employment in Australia